Anfibia is an Argentine online magazine. It was founded in May 2012 by the Lectura Mundi program of the National University of San Martín.

References

2012 establishments in Argentina
Magazines established in 2012
Magazines published in Buenos Aires
Online magazines
Spanish-language magazines